The Women's Individual Pursuit C4 track cycling event at the 2012 Summer Paralympics took place on August 30 at London Velopark. The race distance was 3 km.

Preliminaries
Q = Qualifier
WR = World Record

Finals 
Gold medal match

Bronze medal match

References

Women's pursuit C4
2012 in women's road cycling